Decoding the Universe: How the New Science of Information Is Explaining Everything in the Cosmos, from Our Brains to Black Holes is the third non-fiction book by American author and journalist Charles Seife. The book was initially published on January 30, 2007 by Viking.

Synopsis
In this book Seife concentrates on the information theory, discussing various issues, such as decoherence and probability, relativity and quantum mechanics, works of Turing and Schrödinger, entropy and superposition, etc.

Review

—Salon

Similar books on the information theory

 Leon Brillouin, Science and Information Theory, Mineola, N.Y.: Dover, [1956, 1962] 2004. 
 James Gleick, The Information: A History, a Theory, a Flood, New York: Pantheon, 2011. 
 A. I. Khinchin, Mathematical Foundations of Information Theory, New York: Dover, 1957. 
 H. S. Leff and A. F. Rex, Editors, Maxwell's Demon: Entropy, Information, Computing, Princeton University Press, Princeton, New Jersey (1990). 
 Tom Siegfried, The Bit and the Pendulum, Wiley, 2000. 
 Jeremy Campbell, Grammatical Man, Touchstone/Simon & Schuster, 1982, 
 Henri Theil, Economics and Information Theory, Rand McNally & Company - Chicago, 1967.
 Escolano, Suau, Bonev, Information Theory in Computer Vision and Pattern Recognition, Springer, 2009. 
 Seth Lloyd, Programming the Universe, Alfred A. Knopf, 2006.

References

External links

2007 non-fiction books
Popular science books
Works about information